Richard Trench (1710–1768) was an Irish politician and the ancestor of the Earls of Clancarty.

He was the second son of Frederick Trench and his wife Elizabeth Eyre, daughter of John Eyre. Trench represented Banagher in the Irish House of Commons from 1735 to 1671. Subsequently he sat for Galway County, the same constituency his father had represented before, until his death in 1768. He served as colonel of Militia Dragoons of County Galway.

On 13 March 1732, Trench married Frances Power, only daughter of David Power. They had five daughters and six sons. Trench was buried at Ballinasloe. His third and eldest surviving son William was raised to the Peerage of Ireland.

In 1757 he applied for and received letters patent for the right to hold annual fairs in Ballinasloe on 17 May and 13 July.  While Ballinasloe is now famous for its Great October Fair only, in the past the town also hosted fairs in the other months of the year, the May Fair and the July Wool Fair being the most important of these.

References

1710 births
1768 deaths
Irish MPs 1727–1760
Irish MPs 1761–1768
Politicians from County Galway
Richard
Members of the Parliament of Ireland (pre-1801) for King's County constituencies
Members of the Parliament of Ireland (pre-1801) for County Galway constituencies